"Je danse donc je suis" is a song by French singer Priscilla from her fourth album Bric à brac. It was the album's second track and it was released as its second single. The single came out three months and a half after the album, on October 17, 2005, and debuted at number 45 in France.

Track listing

Charts

References 

2005 songs
2005 singles
Priscilla Betti songs
Jive Records singles
Songs written by Philippe Osman
Songs written by Bertrand Châtenet